William Donahue (August 12, 1834 – July 15, 1892) was a merchant and political figure in Quebec. He represented Missisquoi in the House of Commons of Canada from 1874 to 1878 as a Liberal member.

He was born in Frampton, Lower Canada, the son of Michael Donahue and Mary Murphy, Irish immigrants. Donahue was a merchant in West Farnham and Montreal. In 1882, he married Mary Ann Miller. Donahue served as a member of the municipal council for Missisquoi County. He was mayor of the village of Farnham from 1872 to 1874. He died in Farnham at the age of 57.

References 

1834 births
1892 deaths
Members of the House of Commons of Canada from Quebec
Liberal Party of Canada MPs
Mayors of places in Quebec